Fred Anderson Quartet Volume Two is a double album by American jazz saxophonist Fred Anderson which was recorded live during the 1999 season at the Chicago club owned by Anderson, the Velvet Lounge, and released on the Asian Improv label. Anderson's Quartet features longtime partner drummer Hamid Drake, guitarist Jeff Parker and Asian American bassist Tatsu Aoki.

Reception

In his review for AllMusic, Alex Henderson states "The Chicagoan was 70 when these excellent performances were recorded, and he continues to play with the authority of someone who is very much in his prime."

The All About Jazz review by Glenn Astarita says "Mr. Anderson possesses a deep, rugged tone while portraying a starkly lyrical yet altogether vigorous approach to his craft while often performing in a workmanlike, no-nonsense manner."

Track listing
All compositions by Fred Anderson
Disc One:
 "Look Out!" - 15:58
 "Road Trip" - 37:40
 "Tomato Song" - 12:11
Disc Two:
 "December 4th" - 15:04
 "Exotic Dreams" - 22:31
 "Jeff's Turnaround" - 34:41

Personnel
Fred Anderson - tenor sax
Hamid Drake - drums, percussion
Jeff Parker - guitar
Tatsu Aoki - bass

References

2000 live albums
Fred Anderson (musician) live albums